Reagan Dale Neis (born September 24, 1976) is a Canadian actress. She is best known for her lead role in The WB sitcom Maybe It's Me and co-starring in the Fox sitcom A Minute with Stan Hooper. She has also guest-starred on Joey and Malcolm in the Middle and co-starred in the 2006 film Material Girls.

Biography 
Born in Portage la Prairie, Manitoba, Neis grew up in Red Deer, Alberta. Neis graduated from the Lindsay Thurber Comprehensive High School. Between high school and college, she took a year off, working as a waitress. She then went to Red Deer College, where she studied theater.

Work 
Neis's first acting role on film was in the movie Naked Frailties (1998), where she played the lead female role. Next, Neis played the main character, Molly Stage, in Maybe It's Me. 

Prior to playing Molly Stage, she had done small television roles, including appearing in Malcolm in the Middle as Malcolm's love interest Nikki. The New Zealand Herald wrote that "Canadian actress Reagan Dale Neis is extremely likeable as Molly Stage." Her last known acting credit was in 2016.

Filmography

Awards and nominations

References

External links

1976 births
Canadian expatriate actresses in the United States
Canadian film actresses
Film producers from Manitoba
Canadian television actresses
Living people
People from Portage la Prairie
Canadian women film producers
Actresses from Manitoba